Grey DeLisle, sometimes credited as Grey Griffin, is known for various roles in animated productions and video games.

Voice over roles

Film

Animation

Video games

Live-action roles

References

Book sources

External links
 

Actress filmographies
American filmographies